Roane County may refer to two counties in the United States:

Roane County, Tennessee
Roane County, West Virginia

See also
Roanoke County